Combermere is a village along the Madawaska River in south-eastern Ontario, Canada. It is part of Township of Madawaska Valley. It is named after Sir Stapleton Cotton, Viscount Combermere (1773-1865).

Combermere is best known as home to the Madonna House Apostolate, but the community provides access to numerous lakes and rivers for cottagers and tourists who visit the area. The village is home to the Sinking of the Mayflower Steamship lookout, which gives tourists an overlooking view of the lake where the Mayflower sank on the night of November 12, 1912.

Climate 
Extensive damage resulted when a tornado moved through the area during the evening hours of August 2, 2006. Trailers, roofs and cottages sustained heavy damages with an estimated cost of over one million dollars from the tornado (a strength of F1 according to Environment Canada). A state of emergency was declared in Combermere after the tornado. Acres of land were flattened and groves of century-old pines were destroyed. The same storm that produced the tornado also left about 175,000 hydro customers without power. There were no deaths in the community.

Noted Inhabitants

John Wesley Dafoe - Founder of the Winnipeg Free Press
Baroness Catherine Doherty - Founder of Friendship House in Harlem and the Madonna House Apostolate based in Combermere.
Reverend Eddie Doherty - American newspaper reporter, co-founder of the Madonna House Apostolate.
Eric Schweig - Inuit Actor, Artisan and Outreach Worker.

See also
Combermere/Kamaniskeg Lake Water Aerodrome
Our Lady of Combermere

References

External links
Combermere, The Playground of the Madawaska River

Communities in Renfrew County